Mir EO-21 was a long-duration mission aboard the Russian Space station Mir, which occurred between February and September 1996. The crew consisted of two Russian cosmonauts, Commander Yuri Onufrienko and Yury Usachov, as well as American astronaut Shannon Lucid. Lucid arrived at the station about a month into the expedition, and left about a week following its conclusion; NASA refers to her mission as NASA-2. She was the second American to have a long-duration stay aboard Mir, the first being Norman Thagard, as a crew member of Mir EO-18; he stayed on the station for 111 days. 
Some sources refer to her mission as Mir NASA-1, claiming that she was the first American to have a long-duration stay aboard Mir.

Crew

Mission highlights

Crew handover and Mir Cassiopee
On 19 August 1996, the Soyuz TM-24 spacecraft docked with Mir's front port. It brought to the station two of the next long-duration crew, Valery Korzun and Aleksandr Kaleri. The following expedition, Mir EO-22, would be commanded by Korzun. Also aboard Soyuz TM-24 was French astronaut Claudie Haigneré (then called Claudie Andre-Deshays), whose mission is known as Mir Cassiopee.

References

Mir